The Smithsonian museums are the most widely visible part of the United States' Smithsonian Institution and consist of 20 museums and galleries as well as the National Zoological Park.  17 of these collections are located in Washington D.C., with 11 of those located on the National Mall. The remaining ones are in New York City and Chantilly, Virginia. The Arts and Industries Building is only open for special events.

The birth of the Smithsonian Institution can be traced to the acceptance of James Smithson's legacy, willed to the United States in 1826. Smithson died in 1829, and in 1836, President Andrew Jackson informed Congress of the gift, which it accepted. In 1838, Smithson's legacy, which totaled more than $500,000, was delivered to the United States Mint and entered the Treasury. After eight years, in 1846, the Smithsonian Institution was established.

The Smithsonian Institution Building (also known as "The Castle") was completed in 1855 to house an art gallery, a library, a chemical laboratory, lecture halls, museum galleries, and offices. During this time the Smithsonian was a learning institution concerned mainly with enhancing science and less interested in being a museum. Under the second secretary, Spencer Fullerton Baird, the Smithsonian turned into a full-fledged museum, mostly through the acquisition of 60 boxcars worth of displays from the Centennial Exposition in Philadelphia. The income from the exhibition of these artifacts allowed for the construction of the National Museum, which is now known as the Arts and Industries Building. This structure was opened in 1881 to provide the Smithsonian with its first proper facility for public display of the growing collections.

The Institution grew slowly until 1964 when Sidney Dillon Ripley became secretary. Ripley managed to expand the institution by eight museums and increased admission from 10.8 million to 30 million people a year. This period included the greatest and most rapid growth for the Smithsonian, and it continued until Ripley's resignation in 1984. Since the completion of the Arts and Industries Building, the Smithsonian has expanded to twenty separate museums with roughly 137 million objects in their collections, including works of art, natural specimens, and cultural artifacts. The Smithsonian museums are visited by over 25 million people every year.

Museums
11 of the 20 Smithsonian Institution museums and galleries are at the National Mall in Washington D.C., the open-area national park in Washington, D.C. running between the Lincoln Memorial and the United States Capitol, with the Washington Monument providing a division slightly west of the center. Six other Smithsonian museums including the National Zoo are located elsewhere in Washington. Two more Smithsonian museums are located in New York City and one is located in Chantilly, Virginia.

The Smithsonian also holds close ties with over 200 museums in all 50 states, as well as Panama and Puerto Rico. These museums are known as Smithsonian Affiliates. Collections of artifacts are given to these museums in the form of long-term loans from the Smithsonian. These long-term loans are not the only Smithsonian exhibits outside the Smithsonian museums. The Smithsonian also has a large number of traveling exhibitions. Each year more than 50 exhibitions travel to hundreds of cities and towns all across the United States.

Authorization to create two additional museums, the National Museum of the American Latino and the Smithsonian American Women's History Museum, passed congress in 2020 as part of the Consolidated Appropriations Act, 2021. The museums have not yet been created and the Smithsonian has two years to select the museums’ locations on or near the National Mall.
 

Notes

See also
 List of museums in Washington, D.C.
 Architecture of Washington, D.C.

References

External links 
 Smithsonian Institution website
 Smithsonian Affiliated Museums

Smithsonian